Muriithi/Mureithi is a Kenyan, Kikuyu name meaning "Shepherd". Notable people  who have this name include:
Muriithi Kagai, Kenyan businessman and politician
Ben Mutua Jonathan Muriithi (born 1969), Kenyan radio and television journalist and actor
Ndiritu Muriithi, Kenyan politician
 Jackson Muriithi, Kenyan Lawyer